Tarzan, a fictional character created by Edgar Rice Burroughs, first appeared in the 1912 novel Tarzan of the Apes, and then in twenty-four sequels by Burroughs and numerous more by other authors. The character proved immensely popular and quickly made the jump to other media, first and most notably to comics and film. This article concerns Tarzan's appearance in film and other non-print media.

Film

The earlier Tarzan films were silent pictures adapted from the original Tarzan novels which appeared within a few years of the character's creation. With the advent of talking pictures, a popular Tarzan movie franchise was developed, which was anchored by actor Johnny Weissmüller in the title role, which lasted from 1932 to 1948. Tarzan films under Weissmüller often featured the character's chimpanzee companion, Cheeta. Later Tarzan films after Weissmüller have been occasional and somewhat idiosyncratic.

Silent film

The earlier Tarzan films were eight silent features and serials released between 1918 and 1929, most based on novels in the original series. Elmo Lincoln starred in the first Tarzan feature, Tarzan of the Apes (1918), a faithful cinematic rendering of Burroughs' first Tarzan novel.  The first portion of the film featured Gordon Griffith as the young Tarzan, so Griffith could technically be considered the first screen Tarzan. (Early in the film, Tarzan is also shown as a baby played by at least two different uncredited children.)  Elmo Lincoln returned for two sequels.  Additional silents were produced in the 1920s with other actors (three of these films – The Romance of Tarzan (1918, Elmo Lincoln), The Revenge of Tarzan (1920, Gene Pollar), and Tarzan the Mighty (1928, Frank Merrill) – have been lost).  One of the silents, Tarzan and the Golden Lion (1927), featured the then-unknown Boris Karloff as a villainous native chieftain.  Other actors who portrayed the character in 1920s films were P. Dempsey Tabler and James Pierce (who married the daughter of Edgar Rice Burroughs). The first Tarzan sound film was Tarzan the Tiger (1929), featuring Frank Merrill as the Ape Man, shot as a silent but partially dubbed for release. It was Merrill’s second Tarzan movie, and it cost him the role, as his voice was deemed unsuitable for the part.

The Weissmüller era

The most popular series of Tarzan films began with Tarzan the Ape Man (1932), starring Johnny Weissmüller and Maureen O'Sullivan. Weissmüller, the son of ethnic-German immigrants from Hungarian part of Austria-Hungary, was already well known as a five-time Olympic gold medalist in swimming.  He became the most famous and longest-lasting screen Tarzan, starring as the Ape Man in a total of twelve films, through 1948, the first six produced by Metro-Goldwyn-Mayer and the final six from RKO. The beauteous and scantily clad O'Sullivan was a major factor in the early popularity of the series.  The role of Jane in the films was reduced after O'Sullivan departed in 1942 following the sixth film in the series (and the last for MGM), Tarzan's New York Adventure.  Two Jane-less films followed before Brenda Joyce took over the role for the last four Weissmüller Tarzan films.

Starting afresh with an extremely free adaptation of Tarzan of the Apes which threw out everything that had gone before, the Weissmüller series was a boon to the franchise if not to the character.  In contrast to the articulate nobleman of Burroughs's novels, Weissmuller's Tarzan was a natural hero with a limited vocabulary.  The ersatz pidgin of his dialogue has often been mocked as "Me Tarzan, you Jane," although that particular line was never spoken in any of the films (see insert).

Tarzan and Jane were clearly married in the novels, but their legal status was left ambiguous in the Weissmuller films, even though they shared a jungle treehouse and (particularly in the second film of the series, Tarzan and His Mate) a strong sexual chemistry. In keeping with Motion Picture Production Code requirements, their son "Boy" was found and adopted rather than born to Jane.  The "Boy" character, played by Johnny Sheffield, appeared in eight consecutive films in the series, starting with Tarzan Finds a Son (1939).  Weissmüller's yodel-like "Tarzan yell" became so associated with the character that it was sometimes dubbed into later films featuring different actors. Cheeta the chimpanzee provided comic relief through the series.

Due to complex licensing issues relating to Tarzan, a number of competing films starring other actors were made during the Weissmüller period. The first of these was Tarzan the Fearless (1933), featuring another Olympic swimmer, Buster Crabbe, that was the first Tarzan film produced by Sol Lesser, later to become producer of the franchise when it moved to RKO. The New Adventures of Tarzan (1935), hearkening back to the original concept of the character as an intelligent Englishman, was a serial featuring Herman Brix that was reedited into two feature films, the first released in the same year and with the same title as the serial, and the second, Tarzan and the Green Goddess released in 1938. Brix, another Olympian (shotput) changed his name in 1939 and, as Bruce Bennett, enjoyed a long career in film and television. Tarzan's Revenge, also released in 1938, starred Glenn Morris, gold medal winner in the Olympic decathlon in 1936 and female swimmer Eleanor Holm who was expelled from the 1936 Olympics and featured opposite Weissmüller and Crabbe in Billy Rose's Aquacade; the film again produced by Sol Lesser.

With the exception of The New Adventures of Tarzan, which was partially filmed in Guatemala, the Tarzan movies of this period were mostly filmed on Hollywood sound stages, with stock jungle and wildlife footage edited into the final product.

The franchise after Weissmüller
After Tarzan and the Mermaids in 1948, Weissmuller retired from the series, believing that he was now too old to play the loincloth-clad character.  He went on, however, to appear in a long series of similar adventures wearing a safari suit as Jungle Jim.

After Weissmüller's departure, producer Sol Lesser led a nationwide search for a replacement, auditioning over 200 actors.  The winner was Lex Barker, a tall and strikingly handsome 29-year-old who had grown up in wealth and privilege in New York City.  Barker portrayed Tarzan in five films (1949–1953), each with a different actress portraying Jane (the first one being Brenda Joyce, a carry-over from the Weissmüller series).  These were mostly low budget affairs similar to Weissmuller's RKO films, although the third one, Tarzan's Peril (1951), was an attempt to upgrade the series by filming on actual African locations and using local Africans in the cast.  Despite Barker's aristocratic bearing and good acting credentials, Lesser insisted that he emulate Weissmüller's "Me Tarzan, you Jane" characterization.

Next came six films starring Gordon Scott (1955–1960), a bodybuilder who was discovered while lifeguarding at a hotel in Las Vegas.  His first three Tarzan films, produced by Sol Lesser, continued in the Weissmüller formula.  Lesser also produced several episodes of a Tarzan television pilot starring Scott that was edited into a feature film called Tarzan and the Trappers.

Then the series was taken over by producer Sy Weintraub, who wanted to move the character closer to Burroughs's original conception.  The result starred Scott in two of the best-received entries in the entire franchise, Tarzan's Greatest Adventure (1959) and Tarzan the Magnificent (1960).  MGM released a remake of Tarzan, the Ape Man in 1959, a poorly received film starring Denny Miller. The Weintraub series continued in two films featuring veteran stuntman Jock Mahoney (1962–1963), three with former pro-football player Mike Henry (1966–1968), and two (feature versions of television episodes) with Ron Ely (1970). The Mike Henry films were filmed before the Ron Ely TV series, but were released to theatres after the TV series debuted.  Weintraub had intended Henry to star in the TV series, but Henry declined because of the injuries and illnesses he had suffered during back to back location filming.

The Weintraub productions, including the Ron Ely television series (see below), dropped the character of Jane and portrayed Tarzan as an intelligent but apparently rootless adventurer. The Mike Henry entries, starting with Tarzan and the Valley of Gold (1966), were produced at the height of the James Bond craze, and had a well-tailored Tarzan jetting around the world to take on dangerous missions.  In contrast to most earlier Tarzan films, the Weintraub productions were in color and were shot in exotic locations such as Kenya, India, Thailand, Malaysia, Mexico, and Brazil.

By 1965, films starring Tarzan had collectively grossed over  worldwide, making him the highest-grossing film character up until then. Tarzan's total gross greatly exceeded John Wayne, who was the highest-grossing actor at the time.

Later films
After 1970, the movie Tarzan went on hiatus until 1981, when MGM released its third version of Tarzan, the Ape Man  with Miles O'Keeffe in the title role and Bo Derek as Jane. The film was financially successful, but critically panned.

The better-received Greystoke: The Legend of Tarzan, Lord of the Apes followed in 1984, starring Christopher Lambert. Returning to the source material, it updated Burroughs’ original novel in the light of 1980s sensibilities and science, utilizing a number of corrective ideas first put forth by science fiction author Philip José Farmer in his 1972 mock-biography Tarzan Alive: A Definitive Biography of Lord Greystoke. While restoring Tarzan’s identity as an intelligent human being, Greystoke portrayed his adaptation to civilization as a failure, and his return to the wild as a matter of necessity rather than choice.

The next live-action Tarzan movie was Tarzan and the Lost City (1998) which starred Casper Van Dien. Essentially a follow-on to Greystoke, this film was set in the 1920s and attempted to capture the flavor of some of the later novels in the Tarzan series, in which the ape-man encountered increasingly fantastic civilizations hidden in the deep jungles.

The latest live-action Tarzan film The Legend of Tarzan (2016), produced by Warner Brothers and Jerry Weintraub & directed by David Yates, was released on July 1, 2016. It stars Alexander Skarsgård and Margot Robbie as Tarzan and Jane, along with Samuel L. Jackson, Christoph Waltz and Djimon Hounsou. The new approach blended the characters and the setting from the Burroughs novels with the events of the Belgian Congo in the late 1880s and historical figures with a significant role at the time, such as Leon Rom as portrayed by Waltz.

On September 30, 2022, The Hollywood Reporter has announced that Sony Pictures has picked up the screen rights to Tarzan and is looking to deliver a "total reinvention" of the character.

Animated films
Disney's animated Tarzan (1999) marked a new beginning for the ape man, taking its inspiration equally from Burroughs and Greystoke: The Legend of Tarzan, Lord of the Apes. Its major innovations were recasting the original fictitious ape species that adopted Tarzan as gorillas and turning William Cecil Clayton, his paternal cousin and rival for the affections of Jane in the early novels, into a brawny out-and-out villain known only as "Clayton." Tarzan was voiced by actor Tony Goldwyn and Jane by Minnie Driver.

Two direct-to-video sequels followed, Tarzan & Jane (2002), and Tarzan II (2005), a re-exploration of the ape man’s childhood. In Tarzan & Jane, Goldwyn and Driver were replaced by Michael T. Weiss and Olivia d'Abo.

Also in 1999, a direct-to-video animated version of Tarzan of the Apes aimed at younger children was released by Sony Wonder.

In 2013, Germany's Constantin Film released a Tarzan 3D animated feature in CGI with motion capture. Reinhard Klooss directed. Kellan Lutz and Spencer Locke voiced Tarzan and Jane Porter, respectively. The film opened in a number of countries in late 2013 and early 2014, but received mostly negative reviews and as a result no theatrical release was planned for the U.S. Instead, the film was released directly to DVD and Blu-ray in the U.S. in August 2014.

Other
The film Tarzan corpus also includes a number of documentaries, most of them either made for television or to accompany video sets of Tarzan movies, a number of derivative foreign-language productions from China, India, and Turkey, and various spoofs and parodies. Among the latter is Starzan, a Philippine Cinema comedy film loosely based on the original Tarzan franchise satirizing western entertainment.  It stars Filipino comedic actor Joey De Leon as Starzan, Rene Requiestas as "Chitae", and Zsa Zsa Padilla as Jane.

Steve Sipek also known as Steve Hawkes played Tarzan in two films produced by a Spanish company and intended for world markets. The first was variously titled Tarzán en la gruta del oro/King of the Jungle/Tarzan in the Golden Grotto (1969) and portions were filmed in Suriname, Florida, Africa, Spain and Italy, with interruptions when the producers ran out of money. Sipek claimed the film company could not pay the huge licensing fees from Edgar Rice Burroughs' estate and settled for the name "Zan" or "Karzan" for the character.

A 1972 sequel, Tarzan and the Brown Prince (1972), had portions filmed in Rainbow Springs, Florida. where Sipek was burned in a fire that got out of control.

Stage
A 1921 Broadway production of Tarzan of The Apes starred Ronald Adair as Tarzan and Ethel Dwyer as Jane Porter.

In 1976, Richard O'Brien wrote a musical entitled T. Zee, loosely based on the idea of Tarzan but restyled in a rock idiom.

Tarzan, a musical stage adaptation of the 1999 animated feature, opened at the Richard Rodgers Theatre on Broadway on May 10, 2006. The show, a Disney Theatrical production, was directed and designed by Bob Crowley. The show played its final performance July 8, 2007. Tarzan was played by Josh Strickland. Jane was played by Jenn Gambatese. Terk, Tarzan's best friend, was played by Chester Gregory. Kerchak, Tarzan's ape father was played by Shuler Hensley and Robert Evan.  Kala, Tarzan's ape mother was played by Merle Dandridge. Professor Porter (Jane's father) was played by Tim Jerome. Mr. Clayton (Jane's "love interest") was played by Donnie Keshawarz. And Young Tarzan was played by Daniel Manche, Dylan Riley Snyder, J. Bradley Bowers, and Alex Rutherford.

The same version of Tarzan that was played at the Richard Rodgers Theatre played throughout Europe and was a success in the Netherlands.

Tarzan also appeared in the Tarzan Rocks! show at the Theatre in the Wild at Walt Disney World Resort's Disney's Animal Kingdom. The show closed in 2006. The Tarzan Encounter currently plays in Disneyland Park (Paris), similar to the show at Disney's Animal Kingdom.

Radio
See main article, Tarzan (radio program).

Tarzan was the hero of two popular radio programs.  The first began on 12 September 1932 with James H. Pierce in the role of Tarzan, adapting the novel Tarzan of the Apes in 77 installments, airing three times each week, on Monday, Wednesday, and Friday.  Each episode, not counting commercials, ran for about ten minutes.  This series was followed by two original stories, written by Rob Thompson, "Tarzan and the Diamond of Ashair", 39 episodes airing every weekday starting 1 May 1935, and "Tarzan and the Fires of Tohr", 39 episodes, airing during 1936.  Both of these stories Rob Thompson later adapted for the Tarzan comic strip and again for the Dell Tarzan comic book.

The second Tarzan radio program began 1 November 1951 and ran for 75 half-hour episodes, ending on 27 June 1953. Lamont Johnson played Tarzan.

Television
Meanwhile, television had emerged as a primary vehicle bringing the character to the public, as the corpus of Tarzan films, especially those of Johnny Weissmuller and Lex Barker, became staples on Saturday morning TV. In 1958, in the middle of his six-film reign as Tarzan, Gordon Scott filmed three episodes for a prospective television series.  The program did not sell, and in 1966 the three pilots were edited into a 90-minute television feature entitled Tarzan and the Trappers.

A live action Tarzan series starring Ron Ely ran on NBC 1966–1968 (57 hour-long episodes).  The executive producer was Sy Weintraub, and the series was basically a follow-on to Weintraub's series of Tarzan films that began with Tarzan's Greatest Adventure in 1959.  Weintraub had dispensed with Jane and portrayed his ape man as well-spoken and sophisticated.  Though Ely's Tarzan did not have Jane, he was accompanied by Cheeta the chimpanzee from the movies and a child sidekick, the orphan boy Jai (Manuel Padilla, Jr.), who also played the similar roles of Ramel and Pepe in Tarzan and the Valley of Gold (1966) and Tarzan and the Great River (1967). The character Jai first appeared in the 1962 film Tarzan Goes to India, played by a young actor of the same name.

An animated series from Filmation, Tarzan, Lord of the Jungle, aired from 1976–1977, with new and repeat episodes in the anthology programs Batman/Tarzan Adventure Hour (1977–1978), Tarzan and the Super 7 (1978–1980), The Tarzan/Lone Ranger Adventure Hour (1980–1981), and The Tarzan/Lone Ranger/Zorro Adventure Hour) (1981–1982). In that show, Tarzan is voiced by Robert Ridgely and Danton Burroughs.

Following this Joe Lara starred in the title role in Tarzan in Manhattan (1989), an offbeat TV movie, and would later return in a completely different interpretation in Tarzan: The Epic Adventures (1996), a new live-action series. In between the two productions with Lara, Tarzán, a half-hour syndicated series, ran from 1991 through 1994. In this version of the show, Tarzan was portrayed by Wolf Larson as a blond environmentalist, with Jane turned into a French ecologist.

Disney’s animated series The Legend of Tarzan (2001–2003) was a spin-off from its animated film with Michael T. Weiss as the voice of Tarzan (see Tarzan and Jane in "Animated Films" above).

The latest television series was the live-action Tarzan (2003), which starred male model Travis Fimmel and updated the setting to contemporary New York City with Jane as a police detective. The series failed to meet studio expectations and was cancelled after only eight episodes.

Netflix aired an animated series titled Edgar Rice Burroughs’ Tarzan and Jane set in modern-day where 16-year-old Tarzan (voiced by Giles Panton) returns from the African jungle to a London boarding school where he meets Jane (voiced by Rebecca Shoichet), who helps him solve environmental injustice, crimes and mysteries.

Television sketches/spoofs
A 1981 television special, The Muppets Go to the Movies, features a short sketch entitled "Tarzan and Jane." Lily Tomlin plays Jane opposite The Great Gonzo as Tarzan. In addition, the Muppets have made reference to Tarzan on half a dozen occasions since the 1960s.

The Tonight Show Starring Johnny Carson on August 14, 1981 featured a Tarzan sketch in which Johnny Carson and Betty White portray Tarzan and Jane as a bickering married couple.

In an episode of The Fairly OddParents, a spoof of Tarzan appears as "Lord of the Drapes", and "Lord of the Shapes", instead of Lord of the Apes.

Series One, Episode Two of The Two Ronnies includes a "Tarzan in Suburbia" sketch with Ronnie Barker as Tarzan.

The British ITV Schools series Writers' Workshop has a 1976 episode called Our Hero, discussing the character of Tarzan and featuring Arne Gordon as Tarzan in an extended sketch.

Saturday Night Live featured recurring sketches with the speech-impaired trio of "Tonto, Tarzan, and Frankenstein's Monster". In these sketches, Tarzan is portrayed by Kevin Nealon.

Animated series
The Japanese Jungle no Ouja Ta-chan (King of the Jungle Ta-chan) series, originally a manga by Tokuhiro Masaya, was based loosely on Tarzan. It featured the characters of Tarzan and his wife Jane, who had become obese after settling down with Tarzan.  The series begins as a comical parody of Tarzan, but later expands to other settings, such as a martial arts tournament in China, professional wrestling in America, and even a fight with vampires.

In another anime, One Piece, Roronoa Zoro is seen doing a Tarzan call imitation during the Skypiea arc.

Video games
Taito's 1982 arcade game Jungle King featured a character who resembled Tarzan. Copyright issues required Taito to rename the game, producing Jungle Hunt. The company retained the original character, albeit dressed in safari clothing complete with pith helmet. Gameplay remained unchanged; the player still fought crocodiles and swung from trees, but by ropes instead of vines. Jungle Hunt was subsequently adapted for play on numerous video game consoles and personal computers.

Tarzan Goes Ape was released in the 1980s for the Commodore 64.

Martech Games Ltd released Tarzan in 1986 for the ZX Spectrum, among other computing platforms.

In 1999, games based on Disney's animated film Tarzan were released for the PlayStation, Windows, and Game Boy Color. The PlayStation and Windows version was later ported to the Nintendo 64 in 2000.

Other games focusing on Disney's version of Tarzan include Tarzan Untamed (2001) for the PlayStation 2 and GameCube and Disney's Tarzan: Return to the Jungle (2002) for the Game Boy Advance. Characters from the animated film have also appeared in Disney's Extreme Skate Adventure and Kingdom Hearts.

In the first Rayman, a Tarzanesque version of Rayman named Tarayzan appears in the Dream Forest.

Miscellaneous
There have been several Tarzan View-Master reels and packets, plus numerous Tarzan coloring books, children's books, follow-the-dots and activity books.

In the film Histoire de Pen there is a character named after Tarzan and another named after The Phantom.

Superman's Song by the Canadian rock band the Crash Test Dummies compares Tarzan unfavourably to Superman.

One Leg Too Few is a comedy sketch by Peter Cook concerning a one-legged man attempting to audition for the role of Tarzan.

There is a song by Danish pop group Toy-Box called "Tarzan & Jane", first released as a single in Germany in 1998, and then released worldwide in 1999 to coincide with the release of the Disney film Tarzan (see "Film").

Authorized filmography

Silents Era
Feature Films:

Silent Serials

Sound Era
Franchise films:

Serials and remakes

Animated films

Television 
Tarzan originated in a series of novels, from which a large number of serial films were derived. Television later emerged as a primary vehicle bringing the character to the public. From the mid-1950s, all the extant sound Tarzan films became staples of Saturday morning television aimed at young and teenaged viewers. In 1958, movie Tarzan Gordon Scott filmed three episodes for a prospective television series. The program did not sell, but a number of later series were produced.

Documentaries

 Tarzan: The Legacy of Edgar Rice Burroughs (1996)
 Tarzan at the Movies, Part 1: Johnny Weissmuller (1996)
 Tarzan at the Movies, Part 2: The Many Faces of Tarzan (1996)
 Investigating Tarzan (1997)
 The One, the Only, the Real Tarzan (2004)
 Tarzan: Silver Screen King of the Jungle (2004)
 I,Tarzan (1996)

Unauthorized films

 Tarzan in the Golden Grotto (1969) (Steve Hawkes) (unauthorized by Burroughs' estate)
 Carry on up the Jungle (1970) Tarzan parody (unauthorized by Burroughs' estate)
 Tarzan and the Brown Prince (1972) (Steve Hawkes) (unauthorized by Burroughs' estate)
 Adventures of Tarzan (1985) (Hemant Birje) (unauthorized by Burroughs' estate)
 Lady Tarzan (1990) (Silk Smitha) (unauthorized by Burroughs' estate) 
 Tarzan Ki Beti (2002) (Hemant Birje) (unauthorized by Burroughs' estate)

Actors who have portrayed Tarzan

On film (adult)
 Elmo Lincoln 1918, 1918, 1921 (all silent)
 Gene Pollar 1920 (silent)
 P. Dempsey Tabler 1920 (silent)
 James Pierce 1927 (silent)
 Frank Merrill 1928, 1929 (all silent)
 Johnny Weissmuller 1932, 1934, 1936, 1939, 1941, 1942, 1943, 1943, 1945, 1946, 1947, 1948
 Buster Crabbe 1933
 Herman Brix later billed as Bruce Bennett 1935, 1938
 Glenn Morris 1938
 Lex Barker 1949, 1950, 1951, 1952, 1953
 Gordon Scott 1955, 1957, 1958, 1959, 1960
 Denny Miller 1959
 Jock Mahoney 1962, 1963
 Mike Henry 1966, 1967, 1968
 Ron Ely 1966, 1967, 1968, 1970
 Miles O'Keeffe 1981
 Christopher Lambert 1984
 Casper Van Dien 1998
 Tony Goldwyn 1999 (voice of animated Tarzan)
 Kellan Lutz 2013 (performance capture)
 Alexander Skarsgård 2016

On film (youth)
 Gordon Griffith (1918, 1918)
 Tali McGregor (1984)
 Peter Kyriakous (1984)
 Danny Potts (1984)
 Eric Langlois (1984)
 Alex D. Linz 1999 (voice of young animated Tarzan)
 Harrison Chad (2005)
 Craig Garner (2013) (performance capture of 4-year-old CGI/Motion Capture Tarzan film)
 Anton Zetterholm (2013) (voice of teen CGI/Motion Capture Tarzan film)
 Rory J. Saper (2016)
 Christian Stevens (2016)

On stage
 Ronald Adair 1921 (Broadway)
 Josh Strickland 2006 (Original Broadway Cast – New York, NY)
 Daniel Manche (Tarzan as a youth) 2006 (Original Broadway Cast – New York, NY)
 Alex Rutherford (Tarzan as a youth) 2006 (Original Broadway Cast – New York, NY)
 Dylan Riley Snyder (Tarzan as a youth) 2006 (Original Broadway Cast – New York, NY)
 Anton Zetterholm 2008 (Original German Cast – Hamburg)

On radio
 James Pierce 1932–1934
 Carlton KaDell 1934–1936
 Lamont Johnson 1951–1953

On television
 Gordon Scott filmed 1958, aired 1966
 Ron Ely 1966–1968
 Robert Ridgely 1976–1982 (voice, Filmation series)
 Joe Lara 1989, 1996
 Wolf Larson 1991–1994
 Michael T. Weiss 2001 (voice, Disney series)
 Travis Fimmel 2003

In video games
 Tony Goldwyn, Kingdom Hearts, 2002
 Jūrōta Kosugi, Kingdom Hearts, Japanese

Footnotes

External links
 ERBzine Silver Screen: A Resource Guide to the Movies of Edgar Rice Burroughs
 Tarzan at Brian's Drive-In Theater
 Documentary 52': I, Tarzan
 Tarzan movie guide
Tarzan box office

American radio dramas
Fantasy film characters